Sher is a 2015 Indian Telugu-language action film directed by Mallikarjun. The film stars Kalyan Ram, Sonal Chauhan, Vikramjeet Virk  and Mukesh Rishi. The film revolves around Gautham, a young man who disrupts a gangster's wedding and eventually finds his loved ones threatened. Featuring a soundtrack composed by S. Thaman, the film was released theatrically on 30 October 2015 to a negative critical reception and commercial failure.

Plot 
Pappi is a criminal who's about to marry a girl against a will, until Gautam arrives on a bike and takes her away. They're chased, but Gautam manages to marry the girl to the man she likes. Enraged, Pappi threatens to torture Gautam's family as a form of revenge, but the latter mocks and warns him in turn. Nandini is a photographer who falls for Gautam upon seeing him prevent the tricolor from falling down. However, she hasn't seen him and it's only the tattoo on his hands through which she recognizes him. With passing time, they meet and fall for each other, before Pappi meets Nandini's father Bharat Chandra and convinces him for his marriage to her in exchange for a promotion. Paapi invites his father Dada, a Kolkata-based criminal, to attend his engagement, while Nandini tells about this to Gautam, who meets Bharat and makes a deal with him: Gautam asks him for his gun and the list of Dada and his gang members so that he can kill them and Bharat can take responsibility for the "encounter killings". Bharat agrees and Gautam kills his first target Babbar, Dada's right hand. Afraid that Dada might kill Bharat if he takes the responsibility for Babbar's encounter, he decides to announce it publicly after Gautam kills Dada in the future. Following Babbar's death, Pappi's engagement is stopped and he receives a DVD in which terrorists take responsibility for Babbar's murder. He nevertheless decides to marry Nandini within the next 30 days.

Gautam and his partner Brahmi are taken hostage by Pappi who makes them stay in their house. Gautam and Nandini conspire to convince Pappi to postpone the marriage, but instead he prepones it and informs Dada about his marriage. Dada scolds him, and tells him that his brother Chotu has arrived in the city and taken Babbar's corpse for forensic tests. Learning this, Gautam and Brahmi wear masks and beat up Chotu, who arrives at Pappi's house and stops the marriage. He then recalls one of the attackers had a tattoo on their right hand but is unable to understand the language it was written in (Telugu). Later,  Dr. Kanakarathnam arrives with an image from Babbar's corpse's retina. However, it turns out to be an image of one of the superstars in whose disguise Gautam and Brahmi had beaten up Chotu. It is then revealed that due to being tortured, the doctor had joined hands with Gautam and also erased the tattoo from his hand.

Pappi becomes disillusioned by the constant hindrances and decides to call off the wedding. Worried about his deal with Bharat, Gautam introduces a "Lungi" Baba who tells Pappi that he can marry but first he must invite his father Dada and uncle Chotta. As Chotta arrives, Gauatam attacks and  kills him along with his henchmen. Gautam's father, Raghuram sees him kill Chotta, and Gautam tells him that he did it because when had gone to Kolkata to attend his younger brother Ajay's chess competition, his brother won it but got killed by Dada when he was found filming them killing a man. His mother was injured severely by them too and thus admitted to a hospital where she told Gautam to kill Dada and his men, but since he knew nothing about them, he went back to the spot where his brother died and through his phone viewed the recording. Upon finalizing his targets, he met Bharat and made the deal which was actually for revenge. He couldn't tell his father about this fearing he might get shattered. They then go to meet Gautam's mother, following which Dada calls Gautam and tells him he knew about him through a CCTV recording of the spot where Ajay died. Brahmi meets and hands over the proof of murders to Bharat, who calls the home minister and tells him he found the killer with proof. Hearing this, Brahmi flees away, while Pappi gathers a few more henchmen and is stopped by Lungi Baba who asks him whether he wants to marry or die. He says he wants to marry, and goes along with him.

Cast

 Nandamuri Kalyan Ram as Gautam
 Sonal Chauhan as Nandini
 Vikramjeet Virk as Pappi
 Mukesh Rishi as Dadha
 Ashish Vidyarthi as Chotta
 Sayaji Shinde as IPS Bharath Chandra
 Brahmanandam as Bramhi/Gautam
 Ali as Dr. Kanakarathnam
 Shafi as Chotu
 M. S. Narayana as Lungi Baba
 Posani Krishna Murali as Dadha's assistant
 Sravan as Babbar
 Rao Ramesh as Raghuram, Gautam's father
 Rohini as Gautam's mother
 Master Gaurav as Ajay 
 Sudigali Sudheer as Pradeep
 Prudhvi Raj as Pappi's uncle
 Fish Venkat as Pappi's henchman
 Prabhas Sreenu as Pappi's henchman
 Raghu Karumanchi as Pappi's henchman
 Thagubothu Ramesh as Drunkard
 Ram Prasad
 Getup Seenu
 Racha Ravi
 Nora Fatehi as an item number "Napere Pinky"

Production

Soundtrack
The Music was composed by S. Thaman and released by Junglee Music on 10 October 2015.

Critical reception 
123Telugu gave it 2.75 stars out of 5, praising Kalyan Ram's performance, Thaman's music and the first half, while criticizing the second half and lack of emotions. 
Times of India gave it 2 stars out of 5, praising the shorter running time while criticizing the overall execution. Fullhyd gave it 1 star out of 5, criticizing the technical aspects and writing.

Release 
Makers announces the release date as 30 October 2015.

References

External links
 
 

2015 films
2010s Telugu-language films
Films scored by Thaman S
Indian action films
2015 masala films
Films shot in Thailand
Films shot in Hyderabad, India
Films shot in Rajasthan
Films about Indian weddings
Indian films about revenge
2015 action films